Anthrone is a tricyclic aromatic ketone. It is used for a common cellulose assay and in the colorimetric determination of carbohydrates.

Derivatives of anthrone are used in pharmacy as laxative. They stimulate the motion of the colon and reduce water reabsorption. Some anthrone derivatives can be extracted from a variety of plants, including Rhamnus frangula, Aloe ferox, Rheum officinale, and Cassia senna. Glycosides of anthrone are also found in high amounts in rhubarb leaves, and alongside concentrated amounts of oxalic acid are the reason for the leaves being inedible.

Synthesis and reactions
Anthrone can be prepared from anthraquinone by reduction with tin or copper. 

An alternative synthesis involves cyclization of o-benzylbenzoic acid induced with hydrogen fluoride.

Anthrone condenses with glyoxal to give, following  dehydrogenation, acedianthrone, a useful octacyclic pigment.

Tautomer

Anthrone is the more stable tautomer relative to the anthrol.  The tautomeric equilibrium is estimated at 100 in aqueous solution.  For the two other isomeric anthrols, the tautomeric equilibrium is reversed.

References

Aromatic ketones
Anthracenes